The Millwall Freehold Land and Dock Company was a 19th-century company set up to develop the central area of the Isle of Dogs in London's East End. Originally called the Millwall Canal, Wharfs and Graving Docks Company, the Act for the incorporation of the company received royal assent on 25 July 1864.

The plans that led to the foundation of the Millwall Freehold Land and Dock Company were first devised by Nathaniel Fenner and Robert Fairlie.

References

London docks
History of the London Borough of Tower Hamlets
1864 establishments in England